Pocahontas Fuel Company Store may refer to:

Pocahontas Fuel Company Store (Maybeury, West Virginia), listed on the National Register of Historic Places in McDowell County, West Virginia
Pocahontas Fuel Company Store (Jenkinjones, West Virginia), listed on the National Register of Historic Places in McDowell County, West Virginia
Pocahontas Fuel Company Store (Switchback, West Virginia), listed on the National Register of Historic Places in McDowell County, West Virginia